Gíslason is a surname of Icelandic origin, meaning son of Gísli. In Icelandic names, the name is not strictly a surname, but a patronymic. The name refers to:
Alfreð Gíslason (b. 1959), Icelandic handball player and coach
Gunnar Gíslason (b. 1961), Icelandic professional football player
Gunnar Gíslason (contemporary), Icelandic businessman
Gylfi Þorsteinsson Gíslason (1917–2004), Icelandic politician; member of the Alþing; government minister
John B. Gislason (1872-1960), American farmer and politician
Leif Gislason (b. 1983), Canadian ice dancer
Páll Gíslason, Icelandic physician
Rúrik Gíslason (b. 1988), Icelandic professional football player
Sigurgeir Gíslason (1925-2003), Icelandic chess player
Stefán Gíslason (b. 1980), Icelandic professional football player
Ýmir Örn Gíslason (b. 1997), Icelandic professional handball player

See also 

Gísladóttir

Surnames
Icelandic-language surnames